The Short Type 827 was a 1910s British two-seat reconnaissance floatplane. It was also known as the Short Admiralty Type 827.

Design and development
The Short Type 827 was a two-bay biplane with unswept unequal-span wings, a slightly smaller development of the Short Type 166. It had a box-section fuselage mounted on the lower wing. It had twin floats under the forward fuselage, plus small floats fitted at the wingtips and tail. It was powered by a nose-mounted 155 hp (116 kW) Sunbeam Nubian engine, with a two-bladed tractor propeller. The crew of two sat in open cockpits in tandem.

The aircraft was built by Short Brothers (36 aircraft,) and also produced by different contractors around the United Kingdom, i.e. Brush Electrical (20), Parnall (20), Fairey (12) and Sunbeam (20).

The Short Type 830 was a variant, powered by a 135 hp (101 kW) Salmson water-cooled radial engine.

Variants
Type 827
Production aircraft with a Sunbeam Nubian engine, 108 built.
Type 830
Variant powered by a 135 hp (100 kW) Salmson 18 built. 
S.301
A batch of ten tractor seaplanes, officially listed as Type 830s, with a 140 hp (104 kW) Salmson-Canton-Unné engine, are sometimes described as Short S.301s after the sequence/construction number of the first aircraft. It was a hybrid design, with the wings and fuselage of the Short Type 166, and the straight-edged ailerons and forward observer's position of the Type 830.

Operators

Belgian Air Force

Royal Naval Air Service

Specifications (Type 827)

See also

Notes

Bibliography

Further reading

External links

 Short 827 – British Aircraft Directory

1910s British military reconnaissance aircraft
Biplanes
Type 827
Floatplanes
Single-engined tractor aircraft
Aircraft first flown in 1914